Eastern Antioquia is subregion of the Colombian Department of Antioquia. The region consists of 23 municipalities.

Geography
The region of Eastern Antioquia limits to the north west with the Metropolitan Area of Medellín and with Northeastern Antioquia region. To the east the region borders with the Magdalena Medio Antioquia region, to the south with Caldas Department and to the west with a section of the Southwestern Antioquia region, covering a total area of 8,094 km², approximately 13% of the total area of Antioquia Department.

Municipalities

The region is covered by 23 municipalities being Guarne the closest to the city of Medellín
located some 24 km away. The largest municipality of this region is Sonsón with a total area of 1,323 km² and the smallest one being the municipality of Argelia.

 Abejorral
 Alejandría
 Argelia
 Carmen de Viboral
 Cocorná
 Concepción
 El Peñol
 Granada
 Guarne
 Guatape
 La Ceja
 La Unión
 Marinilla
 Nariño
 Retiro
 Rionegro
 San Carlos
 San Francisco
 San Luis
 San Rafael
 San Vicente
 Santuario
 Sonsón

Demographics
The population in this region is distributed evenly between the urban and rural areas with 43% of the people living in the urban centers and 57% living in the countryside.

References
 Government of Colombia: Se Educa; Regions of Antioquia, Eastern Antioquia

External links
 Oriente Virtual: Comunidad del Oriente Antioqueño 
 Corporación Empresarial del Oriente Antioqueño 
 Incubadora de Empresas del Oriente Antioqueño 
 Agencia para el Desarrollo Económico del Oriente Antioqueño 
 Bilingual Tourism guide of Eastern Antioquia  

Regions of Antioquia Department